Kuehniella is a genus of fungi within the Onygenaceae family.

The genus name of Kuehniella is in honour of Harold Hermann Kuehn n (1927 - 1990), who was an American botanist and mycologist.

The genus was circumscribed by G.F. Orr in Mycotaxon vol.4 on page 172 in 1976.

References

External links
Kuehniella at Index Fungorum

Eurotiomycetes genera
Onygenales